La Prosperitat is a neighborhood in the Nou Barris district of Barcelona, Catalonia (Spain).

Prosperitat, la
Prosperitat, la